The Interconfessional laws were a series of 19th century laws in Austria which were meant to install a government based on Separation of Church and State and voted on 25 May, 1868.

Opposition
Bishop Rudigier of Linz became known for his memorable struggle against these laws, which were not only hostile to the Church, but to the marriage and school laws. The opposition to these ordinances led to judicial proceedings against the bishop and to a fine, which was, however, at once remitted by the Emperor.

Confiscated land
This defense of the rights of the Church with regard to the Christian schools had another negative result.  In 1869 the Liberal parliamentary majority confiscated the lands forming the endowment of the diocese of Linz, and withheld them until the downfall of Liberalism in 1883.

References

Legal history of Austria
Separation of church and state
1868 in law